Clamor was a bi-monthly magazine published in Toledo, Ohio, and founded by Jen Angel and Jason Kucsma. The focus of the magazine was alternative culture (covering art, commentary, cultural criticism, photography, interviews, politics, and music), often from a politically left-wing perspective.

Clamor magazine hosted the Midwest Zine Conference which later became Allied Media Projects and the Allied Media Conference. It was reported in November 2006 that Clamor intended to go out of business. According to New York City Indymedia, Clamor published over 1000 writers and artists in its seven-year, 38-issue run.

References

External links
 Official website and online archive
 Altar Magazine (merged with Clamor in 2006)
 "The IPA’s Domino Effect: The Enron of Indie Media Leaves Publications in a Pinch", The Indypendent, January 10, 2007

Alternative magazines
Defunct political magazines published in the United States
Defunct magazines published in the United States
Magazines established in 1999
Magazines disestablished in 2006
Magazines published in Ohio
Mass media in Toledo, Ohio
1999 establishments in Ohio